The Speaker of the Seimas (literally translated as Chairman of the Seimas) is the presiding officer of the Seimas, the parliament of Lithuania. The speaker and deputy speakers are elected by the members of the Seimas during the session.

Speakers

1920–1940

1990–present

First deputy speakers

Deputy speakers

References

External links
Official website

Speakers
Lithuania, Speakers
Seimas, Speakers